Jo(h)n Ham(m) may refer to:
John Ham, MP for New Shoreham in 1433
John Ham, co-founder of Ustream
John E. Hamm (1776–1864), American colonel, doctor and politician
John Hamm (born 1938), Canadian physician and politician
Jon Hamm (born 1971), American actor, director and producer
Jonathan Hamm (born 1985), former amateur boxer, actor, football player and current mixed martial artist